Yuornis (meaning "Henan bird", after the one Chinese character abbreviation of Henan, ) is an extinct genus of enantiornithine bird known from the Late Cretaceous of Henan, China. It contains one species, Yuornis junchangi, named after the late Lü Junchang.

Description 
The holotype specimen is remarkably complete for a Late Cretaceous enantiornithine, possessing a three dimensionally-preserved skull and partial skeleton. Unlike most enantiornithines, the skull of Yuornis was completely toothless and convergently similar to that of neornithines (modern birds). The lacrimal and postorbital bones are completely absent and the squamosal is strongly reduced; these losses leave the antorbital fenestra and supratemporal fenestra confluent with the orbit (eye socket), also like some modern birds. Unlike modern birds, the premaxilla makes up a smaller portion of the lower edge of the snout, while the quadratojugal is unusually large and complex.

Classification 
The phylogenetic analysis of Xu et al. (2021) positioned Yuornis as the sister taxon to Gobipteryx, another toothless Late Cretaceous enantiornithean. This would by definition place Yuornis in the family Gobipterygidae. However, the traits supporting this relationship were all related to tooth loss, a condition which is known to have convergently evolved many times in Mesozoic bird lineages. As a result, the authors refrained from formally considering Yuornis a gobipterygid.

References

Enantiornitheans
Extinct birds of Asia
Fossil taxa described in 2021